The National Party was a minor political party in the Irish Free State between 1924 and 1925. It was a splinter group of nine Cumann na nGaedheal TDs led by Joseph McGrath, who had been Minister for Industry and Commerce in the Cumann na nGaedheal government.

McGrath founded the National Party in the aftermath of the Army Mutiny, the last military challenge to civilian authority in Ireland. The nine TDs protested the refusal of the government to reinstate mutineers among the officer corps in October 1924. They were also impatient with progress towards a united 32-county Republic.

The nine resigned their seats triggering simultaneous by-elections in March 1925, described as a "mini-general election", as a test of public opinion and sympathy with the mutiny. Seven of the polls were won by Cumann na nGaedheal; the other two were won by the abstentionist candidates of Sinn Féin, then led by Éamon de Valera. None of the men themselves ran in the by-elections to retain their seats. The March 1925 "mini-general election" was the only time that double by-elections occurred in Ireland (filling two vacancies in the same constituency at the same time), Dublin North and Leitrim–Sligo both elected two TDs.

Members

 Francis Cahill
 Thomas Carter
 Henry Finlay
 Seán Gibbons
 Alexander McCabe
 Daniel McCarthy
 Seán McGarry
 Joseph McGrath
 Seán Milroy

Notes

References
Barberis, Peter, John McHugh and Mike Tyldesley, 2005. Encyclopedia of British and Irish Political Organisations. London: Continuum International Publishing Group. , 

National Party "CANDIDATES", Irish Independent Friday, 31 October 1924, Page 7 

1924 establishments in Ireland
1925 disestablishments in Ireland
Defunct political parties in the Republic of Ireland
Political parties disestablished in 1925
Political parties established in 1924